Mettler is a surname. Notable people with the surname include:

Barbara Mettler (born 1971), Swiss cross country skier
Bill Mettler (born 1946), American swimmer
Cecilia Mettler, American medical historian
Dölf Mettler (1934–2015), Swiss yodeler, composer and painter
Jim Mettler, American politician
Ken Mettler (born 1953), American political activist
Liselotte Mettler, Austrian-German surgeon
Peter Mettler (born 1958), Swiss-Canadian film director and cinematographer
Ruben F. Mettler (1924-2006), American businessman
Suzanne Mettler, American political scientist and author

See also
Mettler, California